It's Time for Love is the sixth album by Teddy Pendergrass.

It's Time for Love may also refer to:

 "It's Time for Love", a 1975 song by The Chi-Lites
 "Don't Say Goodnight (It's Time for Love)", a 1980 soul song
 "It's Time for Love" (Don Williams song), a 1985 country song

See also

 A Time for Love (disambiguation)
 A Time for Love (disambiguation)